Electronic Adventures may refer to:
 The Adventures of the Electronic, 1980 Soviet TV miniseries
 Electronic Adventures (album), 2006 album by Detroit Techno